Errikos Kontarinis (Greek: Ερρίκος Κονταρίνης; 1906–1971) was a Greek actor and cinematographer. He was born on the island of Tinos in 1906 and died on 11 September 1971.  He was married to Marika Nezer.

Filmography

External links

1906 births
1971 deaths
People from Tinos
Greek cinematographers
20th-century Greek male actors